Broken Hearts & Dirty Windows: Songs of John Prine is a 2010 tribute album consisting of covers of John Prine songs performed by various artists. The album was released on June 21, 2010, together with the Prine album In Person & On Stage, on the label Prine started in 1981, Oh Boy Records. The album's title is a reference to a lyric from the Prine song "Souvenirs". Justin Vernon, lead singer of Bon Iver, wrote some of the liner notes for the album, in which he describes his first time hearing Prine's music as a kid in his parents' car. A follow-up "Volume 2" was released in 2021, a year and a half after Prine's death from COVID-19.

Reception
The album met with mostly positive reviews upon its release, though Allison Stewart criticized it for excluding some of Prine's best songs and the musicians on the album for being "overly reverent." Another lukewarm review came from PopMatters' Andrew Gilstrap, who wrote that "By and large, the various treatments on Broken Hearts don’t rock the boat too much. The vibe is far too amiable for anyone to strike out on a quest to provide their own definitive version of a Prine song." A similar criticism was offered by Ken Tucker, who wrote that most of the bands on the album perform Prine's songs with "flat-footed awe" and criticized the album as "dreary".

Track listing

References

2010 compilation albums
John Prine tribute albums
Country music compilation albums
Oh Boy Records albums